Round Up is an amusement ride consisting of a circular horizontal platform with a vertical cage-like wall around the edge. The platform is attached to a motor on a hydraulic arm. The ride starts out by spinning until the centrifugal force is enough to push riders against the wall. Then the arm raises the horizontal platform to a vertical position in which riders, instead of spinning horizontally, are now spinning almost vertically.

The ride spins for a predetermined cycle until an automatic timer releases the hydraulic fluid from the arm, causing the platform to return to its horizontal position. The operator may be required to manually control the spin of the ride so that its exit aligns correctly with the exit gate. Most require the rider to be at least 42 inches tall.

In the United Kingdom, this ride is commonly known as the Meteor or Meteorite. The first such ride to arrive in that same country was with Rose Brothers in the 1950s and it came from Germany.

Although Hrubetz examples exist in the United Kingdom, other common makers include Cadoxton and Sam Ward.

There are 70 Round Ups in the United States, 40 in the United Kingdom and 20 in Australia.

New models
The new portable model, made by Dartron, is known as Zero Gravity. The lighting and appearance has changed and the ride has gone from tire rim drive to direct center gear drive, but its operation remains the same. The title is ironic because, the ride does the opposite of creating the sense of zero gravity, as it only gives off the illusion that there is an increase in gravity.

Another version, also made by Dartron, exists called "Zendar", where the platform tilts on the end of the arm.

Locations

Past appearances

See also
 Gravitron
 Rotor (ride)
 Tagada

References

External links

Dartron Rides
Amusement Ride Extravaganza – Roundup

Amusement rides